Aylesford railway station is on the Medway Valley Line in Kent, England, serving the village of Aylesford. The station opened on 18 June 1856.

The station and all trains that serve the station are operated by Southeastern.

History
Aylesford was opened by the South Eastern Railway, which merged with local rival London, Chatham & Dover Railway (LCDR) on 1 January 1899 to form the South Eastern & Chatham Railway (SECR). The station became part of the Southern Railway during the Grouping of 1923, and passed on to the Southern Region of British Railways on nationalisation in 1948.

When sectorisation was introduced in the 1980s, the station was served by Network SouthEast until the privatisation of British Railways. On 21 October 1988, a plaque was unveiled at Aylesford in the presence of Network SouthEast Director, Chris Green, to commemorate completion of the project to restore the station building to its original 1856 condition. The project cost £250,000, £50,000 of which was contributed by the Railway Heritage Trust. During the ceremony, Chris Green announced plans for a £4 million resignalling package for the Medway Valley line to replace the semaphore signals by a multi-aspect colour light system controlled from  box.

The ticket office, in a building on the northbound platform, closed in September 1989 and an Indian restaurant—now incorporating a fried chicken takeaway—was subsequently established in the building. In 2007, a PERTIS (Permit to Travel) ticket machine was installed just inside the entrance to the station, on the northbound platform. In early 2016 the Permit to Travel machine was removed with plans to replace it with a ticket machine.

Services
All services at Aylesford are operated by Southeastern using  EMUs.

The typical off-peak service in trains per hour is:
 2 tph to 
 2 tph to  via 

On Sundays, the service is reduced to hourly in each direction.

Station Building

The section of the line surrounding Aylesford Station passes through what was part of the Preston Hall Estate, the then home of Edward Betts, the railway contractor who built this part of the Medway Valley Line. Consequently, the station building is much grander than other country stations along the line. The station buildings are gabled and highly decorated, built in Kentish ragstone with Caen stone dressings, in part reflecting a simplified version of the style of Preston Hall. Windows replicate those at Aylesford Priory.

Following restoration and refurbishment, the station building received an Ian Allan award in 2001, commemorated by a plaque in the waiting room/booking office, which is now in use as an Indian Takeaway Restaurant.

References

Notes

Bibliography
 
 
 
 Station on navigable O.S. map

External links

 

Tonbridge and Malling
Railway stations in Kent
DfT Category F2 stations
Former South Eastern Railway (UK) stations
Railway stations in Great Britain opened in 1856
Railway stations served by Southeastern